Luke O'Connor (1844 – 29 May 1927) was a New Zealand cricketer. He played in one first-class match for Wellington in 1876/77.

See also
 List of Wellington representative cricketers

References

External links
 

1844 births
1927 deaths
New Zealand cricketers
Wellington cricketers
Place of birth missing